was a Japanese video game manufacturer in operation from 1982 to 2004. The studio focused in the 1980s developing games for Japanese home computers, in the 1990s shifted to console game development, and in the 2000s to mobile games. They also published Western games in the Japanese market.

History
The company was initially known for the successful J.B. Harold Murder Club series of murder mystery adventure games, developed from 1986 onwards. They were initially released as computer games and later ported to the PC Engine CD console, Nintendo Family Computer, Nintendo DS handheld, and iOS mobile.

Riverhillsoft also published Prince of Persia in Japan. Their ports to the Japanese NEC PC-9801 and PC Engine CD platforms featured improved graphics (introducing the Prince's classic "turban and vest" appearance) and a new Red Book audio soundtrack. They also ported it to other computers and video game consoles, helping the game become a worldwide success.

Riverhillsoft were later known for several early survival horror games. These include the 1994 game Doctor Hauzer and the first game in the OverBlood series. Their final release was the life simulation game World Neverland: Waneba Island for the PlayStation in 2000.

Following layoffs in 2000, the company turned its focus on mobile gaming, which proved unsuccessful. In June 2004, it filed for bankruptcy and the majority of its employees left to form a new company, called Althi, Inc., absorbing Riverhillsoft.

Games

See also
Arsys Software
Cing
Level-5

References

External links
Official website (archived)
MobyGames

Companies that have filed for bankruptcy in Japan
Defunct video game companies of Japan
Japanese companies established in 1982
Japanese companies disestablished in 2004
Video game companies established in 1982
Video game companies disestablished in 2004
Video game development companies
Video game publishers